Richard Ernest Cook (born September 7, 1930) is a former general authority of the Church of Jesus Christ of Latter-day Saints (LDS Church) and was also the chief financial officer for the Perpetual Education Fund.  He is married to Mary N. Cook, a young women leader in the LDS Church. Cook was the first mission president of the LDS Church in Mongolia.

Cook was born in Pleasant Grove, Utah.  He received a bachelor's degree from Brigham Young University and an MBA degree from Northwestern University. He spent most of his career as a financial executive with Ford Motor Company.  He married Clea Searle in 1950 and they had four children.  She died in 1984. He married Mary Nielsen in 1988.

He served in the LDS Church as a counselor in the presidency of the Bloomfield Hills Michigan Stake. In the mid-1990s, Cook and his wife, Mary, went to Mongolia to serve as missionaries for the LDS Church. He served as the first mission president in Mongolia. He was a member of the church's Second Quorum of the Seventy from 1997 to 2001.  During much of this time he served in the Asia Area presidency.

From 2001 to 2012, Cook served as the chief financial officer of the Perpetual Education Fund.

References
“Elder Richard E. Cook Of the Seventy,” Ensign, May 1997, p. 103
Deseret News 2008 Church Almanac (Salt Lake City, Utah: Deseret Morning News, 2007) pp. 103, 422–423

External links
Grampa Bill's G.A. Pages: Richard E. Cook

1930 births
American Mormon missionaries
Brigham Young University alumni
Kellogg School of Management alumni
Living people
Members of the Second Quorum of the Seventy (LDS Church)
Mission presidents (LDS Church)
Mormon missionaries in Mongolia
People from Pleasant Grove, Utah
20th-century Mormon missionaries
American expatriates in Mongolia
American general authorities (LDS Church)
American chief financial officers
Latter Day Saints from Utah
Latter Day Saints from Michigan